GBFL may refer to:

 Grand Bahama Football League, the highest form of association football on the Bahamian island of Grand Bahama
 Great Belt Fixed Link, a multi-element fixed link crossing the Great Belt strait between the Danish islands of Zealand and Funen